Isodontosaurus is an extinct genus of iguanian lizard from the Late Cretaceous of Mongolia and China. The type species is Isodontosaurus gracilis. Isodontosaurus is part of an extinct group of Late Cretaceous iguanians called Gobiguania, which is currently thought to be endemic to Mongolia.

References

External links
 Isodontosaurus on paleofile.com

Cretaceous lizards
Prehistoric lizard genera
Late Cretaceous lepidosaurs of Asia
Fossil taxa described in 1943
Taxa named by Charles W. Gilmore